Thomas G. Hannan (born January 14, 1980) is an American former competition swimmer and Olympic gold medalist.

Hannan won gold medals at the 1999 World University Games and the Swimming at the 2000 Summer Olympics.  At the 2003 Pan American Games he served as the team captain.

Hannan was born in Baltimore, Maryland, and graduate from Mount Saint Joseph High School in Baltimore. He swam for Eagle Swim Team, EST, for a considerably long amount of time. He attended the University of Texas at Austin, where he helped the Texas Longhorns swimming and diving team win three NCAA national team championships (2000, 2001, 2002).  He was part of an NCAA champion 4×100-meter medley relay team, and a team that set a new American record in the 4×100-meter freestyle relay while winning the NCAA championship.  He graduated from the University of Texas in 2003.

He later served as the assistant swimming coach for the Washington Huskies at the University of Washington.  He now resides in Seattle, Washington, and coaches the Power and National groups for KING Aquatic Club.

See also
 List of Olympic medalists in swimming (men)
 List of University of Texas at Austin alumni

References

External links 
 

1980 births
Living people
American male butterfly swimmers
Texas Longhorns men's swimmers
Olympic gold medalists for the United States in swimming
Sportspeople from Baltimore
Swimmers at the 2000 Summer Olympics
Medalists at the 2000 Summer Olympics
Pan American Games competitors for the United States
Swimmers at the 2003 Pan American Games
Universiade medalists in swimming
Universiade gold medalists for the United States
Medalists at the 1999 Summer Universiade
Swimmers from Maryland
20th-century American people
21st-century American people